Lamar Anthony Green (born March 22, 1947) is a retired American professional basketball player.

Career
A 6'7" power forward from Morehead State University, Green played six seasons (1969–1975) in the National Basketball Association and American Basketball Association. He spent five years as a backup power forward for the Phoenix Suns, averaging 5.2 points, 6.3 rebounds in 17.9 minutes a game. His most productive season came in 1972–73, when he averaged 6.7 points and 9.3 rebounds in 25.6 minutes a game. His 2,186 rebounds are the 17th most in Suns franchise history, while his 345 games are the 18th most in franchise history. Left unprotected by the Suns, Green was drafted by the New Orleans Jazz in the 1974 NBA Expansion Draft, where he played 15 games before being waived. He then signed with the Virginia Squires of the ABA, where he appeared in 51 games in the 1974–75 season. Green was waived by the Squires on September 30, 1975.

Career statistics

Regular season

Playoffs

References

External links 
 

1947 births
Living people
American men's basketball players
Basketball players from Birmingham, Alabama
Morehead State Eagles men's basketball players
New Orleans Jazz players
Phoenix Suns draft picks
Phoenix Suns players
Power forwards (basketball)
Virginia Squires players